Madhyapurisvarar Temple, Paranjervazhi is a Siva temple in Erode district in Tamil Nadu (India).

Vaippu Sthalam
It is one of the shrines of the Vaippu Sthalams sung by Tamil Saivite Nayanar Appar. Now, this place is known as Paranjervazhi.

Presiding deity
The presiding deity is Madhyapurisvarar. The Goddess is known as Sukundha Kunthalambikai.

Location
The temple is situated in Paranjervazhi in Kangeyam-Chennimalai road, at a distance of 8 km from Natthakadayur.

References

External links
 மூவர் தேவார வைப்புத்தலங்கள், பரப்பள்ளி - parappaLLi Sl.No.203
 தேவார வைப்புத்தலங்கள், பரப்பள்ளி Sl.No.102, Appar 6-71-1

Shiva temples in Erode district